James Howie (19 March 1878 – January 1963) was a Scottish footballer who later became a manager.

Born in Galston, Ayrshire, he joined Kilmarnock from local junior side Galston Athletic in 1898. He was in the side which won the 1898–99 Scottish Division Two title and the following season earned selection to the Scottish League representative side. He joined Kettering Town in 1901 then moved to Bristol Rovers the next season.

Howie was signed by Newcastle United in May 1903 and between then and 1910 made 237 appearances for the club, scoring 83 goals. He won the Football League Championship three times (1904–05, 1906–07 and 1908–09) and was also an FA Cup winner in 1910. During this period he earned three caps for the Scottish national side, making his debut in 1905.

Howie was universally known in the game as "Gentleman James" but was equally notable for his peculiar running action, which looked like a hopping motion. After leaving Newcastle in December 1910 he spent three seasons with Huddersfield Town before retiring.

In 1913 Howie moved into management when appointed manager of Queens Park Rangers, a position he held for seven years. He was then secretary-manager of Middlesbrough from March 1920 until May 1924. His brother David, also a former professional footballer, was concurrently manager of Bradford Park Avenue.

It is believed that after football Howie became a tobacconist in London.

Honours
Newcastle United
Football League championship: 1904–05, 1906–07, 1908–09
 FA Cup winner: 1910
Runner-up: 1908

References

Sources

1878 births
1963 deaths
Footballers from East Ayrshire
Scottish footballers
Scotland international footballers
Association football forwards
Kilmarnock F.C. players
Kettering Town F.C. players
Bristol Rovers F.C. players
Newcastle United F.C. players
Huddersfield Town A.F.C. players
Scottish football managers
Queens Park Rangers F.C. managers
Middlesbrough F.C. managers
Place of death missing
Scottish Football League players
Scottish Football League representative players
Scottish Junior Football Association players
English Football League players
FA Cup Final players